At 7am on 18 April 1996, four Islamists carried out a mass shooting against a group of 88 Greek tourists outside the Europa Hotel in Cairo, Egypt. Eighteen people were killed - 17 Greek tourists and one Egyptian. The victims were outside the hotel, about to board a bus to Alexandria. Al-Jama'a al-Islamiyya claimed responsibility for the attack, saying that they thought the tourists were Israelis. The Egyptian Sunni jihadist group carried out attacks in the 1990s, some of which targeted tourists.

See also
 List of Islamist terrorist attacks
 Terrorism in Egypt

References

1996 in Egypt
1996 mass shootings in Africa
1996 shooting
1996 murders in Egypt
20th-century mass murder in Africa
April 1996 crimes
April 1996 events in Africa
1996 shooting
Islamic terrorist incidents in 1996 
1996 shooting
Mass shootings in Egypt
Terrorist incidents in Egypt in 1996
1996 shooting